Kamala Khan is a superheroine who appears in American comic books published by Marvel Comics. Created by editors Sana Amanat and Stephen Wacker, writer G. Willow Wilson, and artists Adrian Alphona and Jamie McKelvie, Kamala is Marvel's first Muslim character and South Asian American personality with her own comic book. She made her first appearance in Captain Marvel #14 (August 2013) before starring in the solo series Ms. Marvel, which debuted in February 2014.

In the Marvel Universe, Kamala is a teenage Pakistani-American from Jersey City, New Jersey with body-morphing abilities who discovers that she has Inhuman genes in the aftermath of the "Inhumanity" storyline. She assumes the mantle of Ms. Marvel from her idol, Carol Danvers, after Danvers becomes Captain Marvel. Marvel's announcement that a Muslim character would headline a comic book attracted widespread attention, and the first volume of Ms. Marvel won the Hugo Award for best graphic story in 2015.

Iman Vellani plays the character in the Marvel Cinematic Universe miniseries Ms. Marvel (2022), and is scheduled to reprise the role in the film The Marvels (2023). From 2016 to 2019, the character was voiced by Kathreen Khavari in animated series such as Avengers Assemble, Marvel Rising, and Spider-Man. She was voiced by Sandra Saad in the video game Marvel's Avengers (2020) and the animated series Spidey and His Amazing Friends (2021).

Overview

Creative origins
Marvel Comics announced in November 2013 that Kamala Khan, a teenage American Muslim from Jersey City, New Jersey, would take over the comic-book series Ms. Marvel in February 2014. The series, written by G. Willow Wilson and drawn by Adrian Alphona, marked the first time a Muslim character headlined a Marvel Comics book. Noelene Clark of the Los Angeles Times noted that Kamala is not the first Muslim character in comic books; other Muslim characters include Simon Baz, Dust and M. The character was conceived during a conversation between Marvel editors Sana Amanat and Stephen Wacker. Amanat said, "I was telling him [Wacker] some crazy anecdote about my childhood, growing up as a Muslim American. He found it hilarious". They then told Wilson about the concept, and Wilson was eager to join it. Amanat said that the series came from a "desire to explore the Muslim-American diaspora from an authentic perspective".

Artist Jamie McKelvie based Kamala's costume on his redesign of Carol Danvers as Captain Marvel and on Dave Cockrum's design of the original Ms. Marvel. Amanat asked that the design "reflect the Captain Marvel legacy, and also her story and her background", and said that Kamala's costume was influenced by the shalwar kameez. They wanted the costume to represent her cultural identity but did not want her to wear a hijab, because most teenage Pakistani-American girls do not wear one. Amanat said that they wanted her to look "less like a sex siren" to appeal to a broader female readership.

Marvel wanted a young Muslim girl, saying that she could be from anywhere and have any background. Wilson initially considered making her an Arab girl from Dearborn, Michigan, but ultimately made her a Desi girl from Jersey City. Jersey City, across the Hudson River from Manhattan, has been called New York City's "sixth borough". The city is an important part of Kamala's identity and the narrative, since most Marvel Comics stories are set in Manhattan. Wilson said, "A huge aspect of Ms. Marvel is being a 'second string hero' in the 'second string city' and having to struggle out of the pathos and emotion that can give a person".

The series explores Kamala's conflicts with supervillains and her domestic and religious duties. Wilson, a convert to Islam, said: "This is not evangelism. It was really important for me to portray Kamala as someone who is struggling with her faith ... Her brother is extremely conservative, her mom is paranoid that she's going to touch a boy and get pregnant, and her father wants her to concentrate on her studies and become a doctor". Amanat said, 

As much as Islam is a part of Kamala's identity, this book isn't preaching about religion or the Islamic faith in particular. It's about what happens when you struggle with the labels imposed on you, and how that forms your sense of self. It's a struggle we've all faced in one form or another, and isn't just particular to Kamala because she's Muslim. Her religion is just one aspect of the many ways she defines herself.

Powers and abilities
Kamala develops her superpowers after Marvel's Infinity storyline, when the Terrigen Mists are released. Her dormant Inhuman abilities are activated by the mists on a rare night when she rebelliously decides to sneak out after her parents forbid her from attending a school party. Amanat said in 2022 that when she and Wilson were creating Kamala, the character was originally going to be a mutant before they changed her to an Inhuman. Screen Rant noted that Kamala is a "polymorph", with moves which "are basically Ant-Man and Mister Fantastic's combined". According to academic Sarah Gibbons, Kamala's body-morphing is paralleled by the flexibility required of the characters who live in Jersey City; her unusual, superpowered body shape conveys a non-conforming message.

Her best-known power is elongation, which allows her to extend her limbs, torso, or neck great distances. Kamala's other powers include the ability to alter her size, shrinking and enlarging herself. When she enlarges, she can lift up to 75 tons. Kamala has also used this ability to make her body as thin as paper. She has a healing factor (capable of healing bullet wounds), which works when she is not using her polymorph abilities. If Kamala extensively heals, however, she becomes very tired. She can shapeshift into other people and inanimate objects, although she rarely uses this power.

Asked about Kamala's transition from comic book to live action in 2019, Wilson said: "I think there're some characters who are very much set up for the big screen; they're very naturally sort of cinematic. But with Ms. Marvel, we really weren't interested in creating something that had very obvious film potential [...] She's got very comic booky powers. God bless them trying to bring that to live action; I don't know how that's going to work out in a way that doesn't look really creepy". In the live-action Marvel Cinematic Universe, Kamala's comic-book powers are reinterpreted; she puts on her grandmother's bangle, unlocking her powers and giving "her the ability to create and manipulate a kind of purple 'hard-light' (think Green Lantern, or Symmetra from Overwatch)".

Publication history

Volume one (2013–2015)

Kamala is the daughter of Yusuf and Muneeba Khan and the younger sister of Aamir Khan. She takes the name Ms. Marvel from Carol Danvers, who is now known as Captain Marvel. Captain Marvel writer Kelly Sue DeConnick said that Kamala made a brief appearance in Captain Marvel #14 (August 2013): "Kamala is in the background of a scene in Captain Marvel 14 ... She is very deliberately placed in a position where she sees Carol protecting civilians from Yon-Rogg". According to co-creator G. Willow Wilson, Kamala idolizes Carol and emulates her when she acquires superhuman abilities: "Captain Marvel represents an ideal that Kamala pines for. She's strong, beautiful and doesn't have any of the baggage of being Pakistani and 'different'". "Khan is a big comic book fan and after she discovers her superhuman power – being a polymorph and able to lengthen her arms and legs and change her shape – she takes on the name of Ms. Marvel", Amanat said. Kamala is one of several characters who discover that they have Inhuman heritage after the "Inhumanity" storyline, in which the Terrigen Mists are released worldwide and activate dormant Inhuman cells.

She opposes Inventor, a clone of Thomas Edison tainted with the DNA of Gregory Knox's pet cockatiel, in the series' first story arc. Wilson created the Inventor as Kamala's first archrival to mirror her complexity. She characterized the Inventor and the overall look of the opening story arc as "kooky and almost Miyazaki-esque at times" due to the style of illustrator Adrian Alphona, which balances the drama of the threats faced by Kamala with the humor of Alphona's "tongue in cheek sight gags". During the story line, Khan also teams up with the X-Man Wolverine against the Inventor. Because Wolverine is dealing with the loss of his healing factor during this time, Khan is placed in the position of having to shoulder much of the responsibilities since Wilson felt this was a role reversal that would subvert reader expectations that Wolverine would take the lead in such a team-up.

At the 2014 San Diego Comic-Con International, writer Dan Slott announced that Kamala would join Spider-Man in The Amazing Spider-Man #7 (October 2014) during the "Spider-Verse" storyline. Slott characterized Kamala as "the closest character to classic Peter Parker": "She's a teenage superhero, juggling her life, making mistakes, trying to do everything right".

Ms. Marvel tied into the "Secret Wars" crossover event with the "Last Days" storyline in June 2015, which details Kamala's account of the end of the Marvel Universe. Wilson said, "In the 'Last Days' story arc, Kamala has to grapple with the end of everything she knows, and discover what it means to be a hero when your whole world is on the line". Kamala rushes to deal with the threat in Manhattan and, according to Wilson, "She will face a very personal enemy as the chaos in Manhattan spills over into Jersey City, and she will be forced to make some very difficult choices. There will also be a very special guest appearance by a superhero Kamala—and the fans—have been waiting to meet for a long time".

Volume two (2015–2018)
Marvel announced in March 2015 that Kamala would join the Avengers in All-New All-Different Avengers FCBD (May 2015) by writer Mark Waid and artists Adam Kubert and Mahmud Asrar, which takes place in the aftermath of "Secret Wars", with Kamala personally facing off against enigmatic Asian American billionaire Mister Gryphon. A second volume of Ms. Marvel, starring Kamala, by Wilson, Alphona and Takeshi Miyazawa also debuted after "Secret Wars" as part of Marvel's All-New, All-Different Marvel initiative. Amanat said, By the time this new launch comes around, it will have been almost two years since the premiere of Ms. Marvel—and boy, has Kamala Khan been through a lot since then. She's been slowly coming into her own, dealing with the challenges of navigating adulthood and being a super hero. But her training is over now and it's time for the big leagues; the question is can she handle it? ... As much as Kamala has a right to be there—it's still a bit of a culture shock. Dreaming of being an Avenger and then suddenly being one is a lot to take on for someone of her age. So, she'll be a little awestruck, a little overly ambitious.

In March 2016, Marvel announced with a promotional image illustrating a rift between Kamala and Danvers that Ms. Marvel would tie into the "Civil War II" storyline. Amanat said that this storyline would center "around self-discovery and identity, and a part of that exploration includes separating yourself from those you put on pedestals [...] It has to do with growing up and realizing that you perceive the world differently from even the ones you love". Academic Sandra Eckard wrote, "Kamala at first follows her mentor's lead until she realizes that she is not comfortable with putting people in jail for crimes they may commit. The idea of 'predictive justice' that Kamala fights against leads to a domino effect of her friends abandoning her and Captain Marvel dismissing her from duty in her group and friendship. Kamala, broken and hopeless, goes on a journey to find herself in Pakistan". According to Eckard, Kamala realizes in this journey that places cannot fix a person and problems within oneself "must be figured and sorted out by that person". The story arc introduces Kamala to Kareem, a family friend, and to a young Pakistani hero named Red Dagger. Kamala does not discover that Red Dagger is Kareem, and Kareem does not know Ms. Marvel's secret identity.

Marvel announced in July 2016 that Kamala would join the Champions, a team of teenage superheroes who leave the Avengers after the conclusion of "Civil War II". The team, featured in a series by writer Mark Waid and artist Humberto Ramos, consists of Kamala, Spider-Man (Miles Morales), Nova (Sam Alexander), Hulk (Amadeus Cho), Viv Vision, and a teenage version of Cyclops. Waid said, "The first three are the kids who quit the Avengers proper. That was an easy get. Those three, in and of themselves, form a nice little subteam. Their dynamic is great. They all show up in each other's books, and even though they have their arguments and stress points, clearly they're good together".

The following month, Kamala appeared in Moon Girl and Devil Dinosaur #10 by writers Amy Reeder and Brandon Montclare. She is a mentor to Moon Girl (Lunella Lafayette), a fellow young Inhuman who suddenly acquires her powers. Amanat said that Kamala sees much of herself in Lunella and, by teaching her, learns much about herself.

In November 2016, Marvel announced that Kamala would join a new incarnation of the Secret Warriors in a series by writer Matthew Rosenberg and artist Javier Garron; it debuted in May 2017. The team is composed of "Inhumans who are a little outside traditional Inhuman culture", such as Quake, Karnak, Moon Girl, and Devil Dinosaur, and was formed in the wake of the "Inhumans vs X-Men" storyline. Rosenberg said that there is some conflict and friction amongst the team members: "Ms. Marvel and Quake are really fighting for the soul of the team in a lot of ways, while Moon Girl will continue to really do her own thing. They will all be tested and challenged, they are superheroes after all, but they are going to do things their way". The first five issues of the Secret Warriors series were tied to the Marvel Secret Empire crossover storyline.

Marvel announced in March 2017 that Kamala would join Carol Danvers in a one-shot issue of the limited anthology series, Generations by Wilson and Paolo Villanelle. Wilson said that the issue would explore Carol and Kamala's mentor–student relationship, but "at its heart, [it] is about growing up, and a big part of growing up is discovering that your idols have feet of clay – and forgiving them for their flaws as you gain an adult understanding of your own".

From April to August 2017, the Champions series was also involved in the Secret Empire storyline. In the final story arc of the second volume of Champions, Kamala survived Weirdworld with her teammates. In October of that year, Kareem returns to Ms. Marvel in issue #23 as an exchange student at Kamala's high school. In this story arc, Kamala (as Ms. Marvel) has her first kiss with Red Dagger and they discover each other's secret identities.

Marvel Legacy relaunch
In December 2017, Ms. Marvel began the "Teenage Wasteland" story arc as part of the Marvel Legacy relaunch. Wilson said, "Since the events of 'Civil War II', there's been friction between Kamala and her mentor, Captain Marvel. In this arc, we're exploring how complicated legacies can be when they're passed from generation to generation ... She's questioning a lot about herself and her mission. Her friends end up stepping into some very important—and unexpected—roles. So in a sense, the arc is really about a bunch of chronically under-estimated teenagers who pull together to fight evil".

In January 2018, Secret Warriors was cancelled after twelve issues. Kamala continued to lead the Champions, which relaunched with a third volume that month. According to IGN, "writer Jim Zub will be sticking around, and he'll be joined by new artist Stephen Cummings as the two explore what happens when Ms. Marvel takes the team global". It was announced in July 2019 that Champions was cancelled, with issue #10 in October its last one.

Ms. Marvel #31—the 50th issue of Ms. Marvel featuring Kamala—was published in June 2018. To mark the occasion, Marvel brought in additional collaborators for the issue: writers G. Willow Wilson, Saladin Ahmed, Rainbow Rowell, and Hasan Minhaj, and artists Nico Leon, Bob Quinn, Gustavo Duarte, and Elmo Bondoc.

The Magnificent Ms. Marvel (2019–2021)
Kamala headlined The Magnificent Ms. Marvel, a new series written by Saladin Ahmed and illustrated by Minkyu Jung, in March 2019. Wilson said that she had planned her departure from the series for over a year (originally anticipating that it would only last for ten issues) and was pleased at having written 60 issues. Ahmed said that the new series would have a broader scope, "while still maintaining that intimate tone that people have loved about it".

From April to September 2019, Kamala headlined the ongoing relaunch of Marvel Team-Up. The first three issues, written by Eve Ewing and illustrated by Joey Vazquez, focused on Ms. Marvel and Spider-Man. Issues 4-6, written by Clint McElroy and illustrated by Ig Guara, focused on Ms. Marvel and Captain Marvel; the series was then cancelled.

Marvel announced in July 2020 that Kamala would star in a graphic novel, published in conjunction with Scholastic and aimed at younger readers. Ms. Marvel: Stretched Thin, written by Nadia Shammas and illustrated by Nabi H. Ali, was published on September 7, 2021.

Kamala was a focus of the October 2020 one-shot Outlawed #1, which began the Outlawed storyline in The Magnificent Ms. Marvel series and the relaunched Champions series. The Champions protect a young climate activist, speaking at Coles Academic High School, who is targeted by the Roxxon Oil Company. As the fight between the Champions and Roxxon escalates, the school collapses. Kamala saves the activist, but is critically injured; the government passes the Underage Superhuman Welfare Act, which bans superhero activities for those under age twenty-one, as a result of the disaster. Although the act is renamed "Kamala's Law", the character's secret identity remains intact. 

Champions #1 and The Magnificent Ms. Marvel #14 pick up six months later, as they deal with fallout from Kamala's Law. CBR reported that "without disclosing her true identity, Ms. Marvel rejects Kamala's Law and publicly vows to continue her superhero activities alongside the Champions regardless of her age [...] Kamala's message has quickly split the young superhero community. Several agree to continue their double lives as usual in open defiance of the controversial law, while others believe Kamala is in the wrong and they should leave superhero activity to the adults". During the Outlawed event, the Champions take responsibility for their actions and reveal that Roxxon is using its government contract to intern young individuals with superpowers in brutal reeducation camps. This cause Roxxon to lose its contract, and the government suspends enforcement of Kamala's Law.

After the Outlawed event, The Magnificent Ms. Marvel ended its run with issue #18 (the 75th issue of the Kamala Khan Ms. Marvel comics) in April 2021. Kamala continued to appear in the Champions series, which covered the repeal of Kamala's Law. The series was then cancelled, with its last issue October 2021.

Limited series (2021–2022)

Ms. Marvel: Beyond the Limit
Kamala next headlined a new limited series, Ms. Marvel: Beyond the Limit, written by Samira Ahmed and illustrated by Andrés Genolet. According to Entertainment Weekly, "Ms. Marvel comics have only been written by Muslim writers so far [...]. But Samira Ahmed will be the first South Asian female writer to write a Ms. Marvel series". Ahmed is known for her young-adult novels, and Beyond the Limit was her first comic series. It had five issues, from December 2021 to April 2022. Kamala is on a multiverse adventure after visiting her cousin, Razia, a scientist who specializes in "multiversal theory". The series included multiverse variants of Kamala. A trade paperback collection of the five issues was scheduled to be published in June 2022, reportedly coinciding with the premiere of the Ms. Marvel television miniseries.

Infinity Comics
Marvel released the one-shot Ms. Marvel: Bottled Up, written by Samira Ahmed and illustrated by Ramon Bachs, in May 2022 as part of Marvel Unlimited's digital Infinity Comics. Kamala and her friend, Nakia, confront the destroyer Mariikh at the American Museum of Natural History after the jinn is accidentally released.

In June 2022, Marvel announced a new weekly Love Unlimited romance anthology series on Marvel Unlimited's Infinity Comics. The first story arc, "Ms. Marvel and Red Dagger", was written by Nadia Shammas and illustrated by Natacha Bustos. The first of the storyline's six parts was published on June 9 of that year, and focuses on Kamala and Kareem (the Red Dagger) who have kissed but not yet shared their secret identities.

Ms. Marvel: Fists of Justice
In April 2022, Marvel announced that Kamala would headline a series of one-shots in which she joins three heroes: Wolverine, Moon Knight, and Venom. The first issue, written by Jody Houser and illustrated by Zé Carlos was released in August 2022. According to CBR, the series is "a jumping-on point for Ms. Marvel newcomers, as the new saga will lay the groundwork for the character's next era [...] The series of one-shots begins shortly after Khan makes her live-action debut in the new Disney+ Ms. Marvel series".

Dark Web: Ms. Marvel

Kamala appeared as a new Oscorp intern in the renewable energy division in Amazing Spider-Man #7 (August 2022) where she runs into Peter Parker. In September 2022, Marvel announced that Kamala's internship would be further explored in the two-issue series Dark Web: Ms. Marvel; this limited series is a tie-in to the Spider-Man/X-Men crossover comic event titled Dark Web which details Spider-Man and the X-Men fighting Goblin Queen and Chasm as Goblin Queen's magic reactivates the chip in Inventor's head enough to revive him. The first issue, written by Sabir Pirzada and illustrated by Francesco Mortarino, was released in December 2022.

Reception

Cultural reaction
Kamala's announcement by Marvel had a widespread online reaction. Fatemeh Fakhraie, founder of Muslimah Media Watch (a diversity advocacy group), told Al Jazeera America that "she is going to be a window into the American Muslim experience" and she "normalizes this idea of the American experience as Muslim". Brett White of Comic Book Resources said, "With Kamala Khan, the daughter of Pakistani immigrants living in Jersey City, Marvel Comics has shown yet again that it wants to include groups of the American population that have yet to be personally inspired by their heroes". Hussein Rashid, writing for CNN, said: "The character of Kamala Khan has the opportunity to offer something new to pop-culture portrayals of Muslims. She is born in the United States, appears to be part of the post-9/11 generation and is a teenager". Muaaz Khan of The Guardian compared Kamala to Malala Yousafzai, and the entertainment industry should follow Marvel's example.

Leon Moosavi of the University of Liverpool felt that the character's family would reinforce the stereotype of restrictive Muslim parents, and her shape-shifting ability resembled several anti-Muslim stereotypes (especially taqiyya: a legal dispensation whereby a believing individual can deny their faith or commit illegal or blasphemous acts while at risk of significant persecution). Political satirist Stephen Colbert, parodying right-wing commentators on The Colbert Report, said: "A Muslim cannot be a superhero — for Pete's sake they're on the no-fly list". Conan O'Brien tweeted a joke linking Kamala's religion to polygamy, but removed it due to a public backlash.

Kamala was received positively by students in Jersey City. At McNair Academic High School, the inspiration for the fictional school Kamala attends, Class of 2025 student Shreeya Shankerdas founded the Coles Kamala Korps (named for Kamala's fictional school). Shankerdas said, "When I first heard about Ms. Marvel being this brown teenage girl, I thought it was really cool that we're finally represented. On top of that, we were represented in the Marvel Universe, and I thought that was really cool, because it's a big company."

Critical reaction

2014–2018
Meagan Damore of Comic Book Resources said, "There is nothing not to love about Ms. Marvel #1: every character is well formed and distinct; the story, lovingly crafted; the art, meticulously planned and—at times—downright funny". Jen Aprahamian of Comic Vine said, "Ms. Marvel makes a delightful debut, showing confidence and heart even before she puts on a mask. Kamala is not your average superheroine and her stories seem like they're headed in an exciting direction. Kudos to Marvel for expanding its range; amping up the diversity factor in a way that doesn't feel token or temporary is a great move, and Ms. Marvel is launching with a solid first issue and a world—a universe, even—of story possibilities". Joshua Yehl of IGN said, "Ms. Marvel introduces a vibrant and troubled character that you can't help but love". George Marston of Newsarama said, "Ms. Marvel is a solid debut issue, and that in itself should be a victory not just for G. Willow Wilson and Adrian Alphona, but for Marvel Comics itself ... It's not exactly edgy, and Kamala Khan is not exactly the first reluctant teen hero in Marvel's long history, but Ms. Marvel is one of the strongest debuts for a new character that Marvel has had in a long time".

In 2016, USA Today said that Kamala "broke onto the comics scene a few years ago and has since stolen awards, sales and, oh right, our hearts. Her solo comics, written by G. Willow Wilson, are entertaining and fly off the page, and her appearances elsewhere have only increased". Alex Abad-Santos, for Vox, wrote that "Wilson and Alphona imbue the comic with grace while steering clear of 'after-school special'-of-the-month types of stories [...] As you see Kamala slowly figure out the ways of superheroism and the balance of her own life, you can't help but feel like she represents an alternate path that can save us from the ugly stuff threatening to strangle our hope, our joy, and our love. That's why superheroes were first created, and it's why Ms. Marvel is one of the greatest heroes of our generation".

Katie M. Logan, for Salon in 2017, said that Kamala "signals an important development in cultural representations of Muslim-Americans [...] Kamala Khan is precisely the hero America needs today, but not because of a bat sign in the sky or any single definitive image. She is, above all, committed to the idea that every member of her faith, her generation and her city has value and that their lives should be respected and protected". Joshua Davison, for Bleeding Cool in 2018, wrote that "Ms. Marvel #31 is the landmark 50th issue of Kamala's beloved series. G. Willow Wilson never ceases to amaze me at how she can have me invested in mundane activities like a sleepover. This is done through a good balance of endearing characters, solid drama, and the quirks and detours one can expect from a superhero comic [...] Mix that with some talented artists, and you have a book well worth recommending". In a 2018 review of the series, the Wisconsin Muslim Journal said that the story "is a rare burst of authenticity in what can so easily become clichéd and cheap. In short, Kamala Khan has a refreshing amount of depth".

2019–2022
IGN included The Magnificent Ms. Marvel on its list of "Best Comic Book Series of 2019". Charlie Ridgely, for ComicBook.com, wrote that The Magnificent Ms. Marvel was "an incredible challenge" for Ahmed since he had to follow Wilson, the character's creator. Ridgely said, "Ahmed has leaned hard into the issues that plague our current lives while still making the comic uplifting", and "every revelation that Kamala comes to is thoroughly earned and formed based on the specific experiences we see her confront. It's a master class in evolving a character while keeping them grounded in their own identity".

Avery Kaplan, in her review of Ms. Marvel: Beyond the Limit for The Beat, wrote: "Beyond the Limit was a fun and interesting story that went to some unexpected places, all while allowing Kamala plenty of time to shine (and to make a lot of funny food jokes)". Kaplan added, "Issue five brings the main conflict to a satisfactory enough close while promising further explanation in a sequel series (which I guess is an alternative to an ongoing series, probably based on the idea that marketing five-issue arcs which are subsequently collected into graphic novel-style TPB collections is easier than getting new readers to jump on at issue #546 – whatever, just give me more Kamala)".

Accolades

Sales
Ms. Marvel Volume 1: No Normal was the best-selling graphic novel in October 2014; the following month, it reached No. 2 on The New York Times Best Seller list of paperback graphic books. In April 2015, Ms. Marvel Volume 2: Generation Why debuted at #4 on The New York Times Best Seller list of paperback graphic books. In July 2015, Ms. Marvel Volume 3: Crushed debuted at #3 on The New York Times Best Seller list of paperback graphic books. Ms. Marvel Volume 5: Super Famous debuted at #3 on the July 2016 The New York Times Best Seller list of paperback graphic books. By August 2018, Ms. Marvel had sold half a million trade paperbacks, in addition to digital sales.

During a slump in Marvel's 2017 market share, senior vice president of print, sales, and marketing David Gabriel "blamed declining comic-book sales on the studio's efforts to increase diversity and female characters". Gabriel then attempted to walk-back the statement. George Gustines, for The New York Times, said that "the issue is more nuanced"; sales are also impacted by numbering restarts and fan opinion about storylines. Gustines wrote that in February 2017, Ms. Marvel "sold an estimated 19,870 copies. It landed at 109 out of the top 300 comics for the month. But the series is known to be doing well digitally and with collected editions. There are also other signs of prestige. This week, a collected edition of the series, 'Ms. Marvel: Super Famous,' written by G. Willow Wilson and illustrated by Takeshi Miyazawa, was nominated for a Hugo Award, which is given to the best science-fiction or fantasy stories". Later that year, during Marvel's Legacy initiative, many titles featuring "diverse and new voices" were cancelled. On the survival of the series, Joe Glass of Bleeding Cool wrote that Ms. Marvel periodical sales were only slightly higher than many of the cancelled titles; however, "it could be down to trades sales. It is generally held that these books survive on the popularity of their trades sales, not just in the direct market and local comic shops, but in book stores across the world" and at "Scholastic [book] fairs and the like". Associate professor at Northumbria University and comics scholar Mel Gibson said that Ms. Marvel "absolutely leapt in sales to what could be considered non-traditional comic book readers – such as females, Muslims, or Pakistani-Americans for example. The idea of who reads comics and how they read them was changing. It helped draw in new folk and diversify the fan base".

The hardcover collection Ms. Marvel Volume 1 and Volume 2, which collected the 2014–2015 run and non-MM appearances, made the top 10 of Diamond's Top 500 Selling Graphic Novels charts for September 2020; volume 1 reached number five, and volume 2 reached number nine on the charts. In September 2021, Ms. Marvel Volume 1: No Normal (2014) was number 11 on the NPD BookScan's top 20 Superheroes Graphic Novels Chart.

Cultural impact

In January 2015, images of Kamala began appearing over anti-Islamic advertisements on San Francisco city buses. The advertisements, purchased by the American Freedom Defense Initiative, equated Islam with Nazism. Street artists covered the ads with images of Kamala and messages such as "Calling all Bigotry Busters", "Stamp out racism", "Free speech isn't a license to spread hate", "Islamophobia hurts us all", and "Racist". About the response, Wilson tweeted, "Some amazing person has been painting over the anti-Muslim bus ads in SF with Ms. Marvel graffiti ... To me, the graffiti is part of the back-and-forth of the free speech conversation. Call and response. Argument, counterargument".

Sana Amanat was introduced to United States President Barack Obama at a March 2016 reception celebrating Women's History Month at the White House. In his opening remarks, Obama said: "Ms. Marvel may be your comic book creation, but I think for a lot of young boys and girls, Sana's a real superhero".

Kamala appeared on the cover of The Village Voice in an October 2016 illustration by Autumn Whitehearst which paid homage to J. Howard Miller's "We Can Do It!" poster. The cover was accompanied by "The Super Hero For Our Times: Ms. Marvel Will Save You Now", an article by Mallika Rao which profiled Wilson and focused on the increasing diversity of comic-book characters, creators, and fans.

In March 2018, Merriam-Webster added 850 words to its dictionary. This included the word "Embiggen", which first appeared in a 1996 episode of The Simpsons and was popularized in Ms. Marvel as an exclamation by Kamala when using her shape-shifting powers.

Other versions

Secret Wars
An older version of Kamala appears in Inhumans: Attilan Rising by Charles Soule and John Timms as part of the 2015 "Secret Wars" storyline, which details Black Bolt's rebellion against Queen Medusa of New Attilan. In her review of Inhumans: Attilan Rising #2, Emma Houxbois of The Rainbow Hub said: "While [Kamala has] had a few chances to shine in the core Inhuman book, her reintroduction (complete with character redesign by Dave Johnson and strong line work by John Timms) packs a real punch. Soule's evolution of her powers and costume will hopefully also coincide with further opportunities later in the story to learn more about her views on the resistance and reasons for supporting Attilan – solidifying this version of Kamala as a comparatively matured hero forced to make difficult moral choices".

Exiles
A future version of Kamala appears as a member of the Exiles with Nick Fury, Blink, Iron Lad, Valkyrie and a chibi-style cartoon version of Wolverine in a series by writer Saladin Ahmed and artist Javier Rodriguez which debuted in April 2018.

President Khan
Another future version of the character appears in All-New Wolverine #33 (April 2018) by Tom Taylor and Ramon Rosanas as part of the "Old Woman Laura" storyline as the future President of the United States. Kieran Shiach of Comic Book Resources said, "Kamala as President of the United States makes a lot of sense. She's smart, resourceful and cares about her community ... It also helps solidify the world of 'Old Woman Laura' as a 'good future,' presenting a President who is both a woman and Muslim as a possibility within our lifetime".

Kamala Kang

Collections

In other media
Marvel creative consultant Joe Quesada said in September 2016 that Ms. Marvel would appear in "other media" because of the character's success, which "doesn't happen a lot" and probably would not have happened ten years earlier.

Animation
Kamala, voiced by Kathreen Khavari, made her television debut in the animated series Avengers Assemble. She appeared in the third and fourth seasons, Avengers: Ultron Revolution (2016) and Avengers: Secret Wars (2017), as a recurring character and founding member of the All-New, All-Different Avengers.

The character appeared in the 2017 anime series Marvel Future Avengers, voiced by Akari Kitō in Japanese and Kathreen Khavari in English. Kamala appeared in the 2018 animated television film, Marvel Rising: Secret Warriors, voiced by Kathreen Khavari. The film was followed by five animated specials in 2019, and Khavari reprised her role as Kamala throughout the Marvel Rising series.

Kamala appeared in the second season of Marvel's Spider-Man, again voiced by Kathreen Khavari. The character, voiced by Sandra Saad, also appeared in Spidey and His Amazing Friends (2021).

Live action

Kamala (Iman Vellani) is the lead character of the 2022 Disney+ Marvel Cinematic Universe (MCU) live-action miniseries Ms. Marvel, which explores the character's origin story. She has the ability to create glowing constructs, such as elongated limbs and platforms. In the final episode, Kamala's powers are described as a "mutation".

Vellani is scheduled to reprise her role as Kamala in the 2023 film, The Marvels.

Video games
Kamala is an unlockable, playable character in Marvel Puzzle Quest, Lego Marvel's Avengers (voiced by Ashly Burch), Marvel Avengers Academy (voiced by Priyanka Chopra), Marvel: Future Fight, and Marvel Contest of Champions.  Lego Marvel Super Heroes 2 (voiced by Rebecca Kiser), and Marvel Strike Force. Voiced by Erica Luttrell, she is an unlockable team-up character in Marvel Heroes. The character is featured on the Champions table in Zen Pinball 2 as part of the "Women of Power" DLC pack. She is a playable character in Marvel Ultimate Alliance 3: The Black Order (voiced by Kathreen Khavari) and Marvel's Avengers, voiced by Sandra Saad.

Miscellaneous
GraphicAudio released the audio book Ms. Marvel: No Normal in August 2015, with the first five issues of the comic-book series. Jeff Reingold, Marvel's manager of licensed publishing, said that "The challenge here was conveying the comic visuals into a strictly audio form without the use of a third-person narrator".

In March 2016, Marvel Press announced that it would publish a 128-page chapter book entitled Ms. Marvel: Fists of Fury in October 2017. The story focuses on bullying, due to Kamala's gender and background.

Vellani again appears as Kamala / Ms. Marvel in the Disney Wish cruise ship attraction Avengers: Quantum Encounter, which launched in July 2022. She joins the Avengers in facing a rebuilt Ultron.

Notes

References

External links

 Kamala Khan at Comic Vine
 Kamala Khan at Marvel Database

Asian-American superheroes
Avengers (comics) characters
Comics adapted into television series
Comics characters introduced in 2013
Coming-of-age fiction
Culture of Jersey City, New Jersey
Fictional characters from New Jersey
Fictional characters who can change size
Fictional characters who can stretch themselves
Fictional high school students
Fictional Pakistani American people
Hugo Award for Best Graphic Story-winning works
Inhumans
Muhajir people
Muslim characters in comics
Muslim superheroes
Marvel Comics American superheroes
Marvel Comics characters who are shapeshifters
Marvel Comics characters with accelerated healing
Marvel Comics characters with superhuman strength
Marvel Comics child superheroes
Marvel Comics female superheroes
Teenage characters in comics
Teenage superheroes